Fontebranda is one of the medieval fountains of Siena, located in Terzo di Camollia, in the Contrada of Oca, near the Porta of Fontebranda.

History
The fountain was built in the 13th century by the Guild of the Wool-makers (Lana). The first mention of a fountain was in 1081, and documents speak of enlargement by  Bellamino in 1193, and finally rebuilt in its present form in 1246. The fountain is cited by Dante Alighieri in the Divine Comedy (Inferno - Canto trentesimo|Inferno XXX, vv. 76-78).

Structure
The fountain front has three Gothic arches and a crenellated roof. The roof spans a tank fed by water traveling for kilometers to reach the city. The structure was so large, due to multiple use: to get drinking water for men and, separately, for animals, and to wash clothes, especially the textiles made by Arte della Lana (Guild of Wool-makers).

Bibliography
Toscana. Guida d'Italia (Guida rossa), Touring Club Italiano, Milano 2003. 

Fountains in Siena